Andrews Peak is an Antarctic peak,  high, in the Destination Nunataks,  west of Pyramid Peak in northern Victoria Land, Antarctica. It was named by the New Zealand Antarctic Place-Names Committee after Peter Andrews, a geologist with the Victoria University of Wellington Antarctic Expedition (VUWAE) Evans Neve field party, 1971–72, who worked in this area. The peak lies on the Pennell Coast, a portion of Antarctica lying between Cape Williams and Cape Adare.

References 

Mountains of Victoria Land
Pennell Coast